The Long Duel is a 1967 British adventure film directed by Ken Annakin and starring Yul Brynner, Trevor Howard, Charlotte Rampling and Harry Andrews. It is set in British-ruled India of the 1920s but was filmed in Spain.

Plot

Superintendent Stafford of the United Provinces Police has his men arrest an entire tribe on vague allegations of poaching and theft in British India. Sultan, their leader, is also arrested and held in a cell with criminals in Fort Najibabad. Sultan, his wife Tara and many others manage to break out, but Tara and her newborn child both die. Sultan, with the help of his men, revolts against the oppressive British, leading to bitter battles and a final showdown.

Cast
 Yul Brynner as Sultan
 Trevor Howard as Young
 Harry Andrews as Stafford
 Charlotte Rampling as Jane
 Virginia North as Champa
 Andrew Keir as Gungaram
 Laurence Naismith as McDougal
 Maurice Denham as Governor
 George Pastell as Ram Ghand
 Antoñito Ruiz as Munnu
 Imogen Hassall as Tara
 Paul Hardwick as Jamadar
 David Sumner as Gyan Singh
 Rafiq Anwar as Pahelwan
 Shivendra Sinha as Abdul
 Zohra Sehgal as Devi 
 Dino Shafeek as Akbar 
 Patrick Newell as Colonel 
 Jeremy Lloyd as Crabbe 
 Terence Alexander as Major 
 Marianne Stone as Major's Wife 
 Edward Fox as Hardwicke

Production
The film was to be shot in India with British and Indian financing. When the Indian financing fell through, the film was then shot in Spain with Rank Films providing the entire budget. It was the first time Rank entirely financed a movie in 20 years.

References

External links
 

1967 films
British historical adventure films
Films directed by Ken Annakin
Films scored by John Scott (composer)
1960s historical adventure films
British Empire war films
Films set in the British Raj
Films shot in Spain
1960s English-language films
1960s British films